The 6th constituency of Moselle is one of the nine legislative constituencies in the Moselle département (Lorraine).

A member of La République En Marche!, Christophe Arend represents the constituency during the 15th legislature.

Geographic description and demographics 
According to the division into constituencies by the law n°86-1197 of 24 November 1986, the 6th constituency of Moselle includes four cantons and thirty-one municipalities located in the arrondissement of Forbach :
Canton of Behren-lès-Forbach (fr) with thirteen municipalities : Behren-lès-Forbach, Bousbach, Cocheren, Diebling, Farschviller, Folkling, Metzing, Morsbach, Nousseviller-Saint-Nabor, Œting, Rosbruck, Tenteling, Théding
Canton of Forbach (fr) with one municipality : Forbach, the most populated city of the constituency
Canton of Freyming-Merlebach (fr) with ten municipalities : Barst, Béning-lès-Saint-Avold, Betting, Cappel, Farébersviller, Freyming-Merlebach, Guenviller, Henriville, Hoste, Seingbouse
Canton of Stiring-Wendel (fr) with eight municipalities : Alsting, Etzling, Forbach1, Kerbach, Petite-Rosselle, Schœneck, Spicheren, Stiring-Wendel

According to the national census conducted in 1999 by the French National Institute for Statistics and Economic Studies (INSEE), the legal population of the constituency was estimated at 110,486 inhabitants. The population of the constituency amounted to 106,636 inhabitants in 2008.

 The canton of Stiring-Wendel includes a non-urbanized area of Forbach.

Historic Representation 

 On 1 October 1992, Charles Metzinger was elected as a Senator. He consequently left his seat which stayed vacant until the end of the 9th legislature.

Election results

2022 

 
 
|-
| colspan="8" bgcolor="#E9E9E9"|
|-
 
 

 
 
 
 

* PS dissident, not supported by party or NUPES alliance.

2017

2012 

 
 
 
 
 
|-
| colspan="8" bgcolor="#E9E9E9"|
|-

References

Sources
  Moselle's 6th constituency : cartography, National Assembly (France)
  Demographics about Moselle's 6th constituency in 2008, INSEE
  Notes and portraits of the French MPs under the Fifth Republic, National Assembly (France)
  Moselle's legislative constituencies (1958–1986) : MPs in the 6th constituency (Forbach), Atlaspol
  2012 French legislative elections: Moselle's 6th constituency (first round and run-off), Minister of the Interior (France)

6